The Bowerman Track Club (BTC) is an American training group sponsored by Nike, Inc. for professional distance runners as well as a separate recreational club for casual runners. The professional team is supported by head coach Jerry Schumacher and assistant Pascal Dobert. The club maintains a rivalry with the competing Oregon Track Club, also sponsored by Nike, Inc.

BTC athletes won three medals at the 2017 World Athletics Championships. The club is named after Nike co-founder Bill Bowerman.

Purpose
As the organization states itself:

Roster 
Roster from the Bowerman Track Club website.

Men 

 Mo Ahmed
 Grant Fisher
 Evan Jager
 Lopez Lomong
 Sean McGorty
 Thomas Ratcliffe
 Josh Thompson
 Kieran Tunivate

Women 

 Elise Cranny
 Vanessa Fraser
 Courtney Frerichs
 Karissa Schweizer
 Andrea Seccafien

Former members 
Some members have left the club, either due to retirement or change of training plans.

Men 
 Simon Bairu
 Amos Bartelsmeyer
 Andrew Bumbalough
 Matthew Centrowitz Jr
 Chris Derrick
 Elliott Heath
 Ryan Hill
 Dan Huling
 Matt Hughes
 Woody Kincaid
 Tim Nelson
 Jonathan Reilly
 Marc Scott
 Chris Solinsky
 Matt Tegenkamp

Women 
 Amy Cragg 
 Kate Grace
 Marielle Hall
 Shelby Houlihan
 Emily Infeld
Sinclaire Johnson
Gwen Jorgensen
Betsy Saina
 Sammy Silva 
Colleen Quigley

Notes

References

External links
 

Track and field clubs in the United States
Running clubs in the United States
Nike, Inc.
Sports in Portland, Oregon
2003 establishments in Oregon